The Battle of Sarmizegetusa (also spelled Sarmizegethuza) was a siege of Sarmizegetusa, the capital of Dacia, fought in 106 between the army of the Roman Emperor Trajan, and the Dacians led by King Decebalus.

Background
Because of the threat the Dacians represented to the Roman Empire's eastward expansion, in the year 101 Emperor Trajan made the decision to begin a campaign against them. The first conflict began on March 25 and the Roman troops, consisting of four principal legions, the units X Gemina, XI Claudia, II Traiana Fortis, and XXX Ulpia Victrix, defeated the Dacians, and it thus ended in Roman victory.

Although the Dacians had sustained a defeat during the First Dacian War, the emperor postponed the final assault on their capital of Sarmizegetusa to reorganize his troops. Trajan demanded severe concessions from the Dacians and very hard peace conditions: Decebalus, the Dacian king, had to renounce all claims to portions of his kingdom, including Banat, Tara Haţegului, Oltenia, and Muntenia in the region south-west of Transylvania. He also had to surrender all Roman deserters his troops had captured, as well as the Dacian war machines. Upon returning to Rome, Trajan was welcomed as a victorious leader, and in honor of his triumph he took the name of Dacicus, a title that appears on his coinage of this period.

However, during the years 103–105, Decebalus did not respect the peace conditions imposed by Trajan, and in retaliation the Emperor prepared to annihilate the Dacian kingdom and finally conquer Sarmizegetuza. The siege of Sarmizegetuza took place in the summer of the year 106. It is estimated that the Dacians most likely had fewer than 20,000 men capable of fighting the invasion.

Advance

The Roman forces approached Sarmizegetuza in three main columns. The first column crossed the bridge built by Apollodorus of Damascus, and then  followed the valleys of rivers Cerna and Timiş up to Tibiscum. They then turned on the valley of the river Bistra, through the Tara Haţegului depression. In these places, there were already Roman garrisons stationed from the first war, greatly easing the advance.  They passed through Valea Cernei, Haţeg, and Valea Streiului and destroyed the Dacian fortresses at Costesti, Blidaru, and Piatra Rosie.

The second column of the army is believed to have crossed the Danube somewhere near ancient Sucidava and then marched northwards on the valley of Jiu, linking with the first Roman column in Tara Haţegului.  

The combined forces of the two columns then began attacking the area of the Şurianu Mountains, meeting sporadic but desperate resistance from the Dacians.

The third Roman column, most likely led by Trajan himself, advanced through eastern Muntenia, crossed the Carpathians at a location close to what is now Bran, and marched westwards through southern Transylvania .

The rest of the troops left from Moesia Inferior and passed through Bran, Bratocea, and Oituz and destroyed the Dacian fortresses between Cumidava (now Rasnov, in Romania) and Angustia (now Brețcu, in Romania). At the battle for the conquest of Sarmizegetuza the following legions participated: II Adiutrix, IV Flavia Felix, and a vexillatio of VI Ferrata which until this war had been stationed in Iudaea.

The Roman forces then enveloped Sarmizegetuza.

Other Roman units are believed to have attacked other Dacian settlements and rally points, as far as the river Tisa to the north, and Moldavia  to the east. Dacian settlements in the west, such as Ziridava, were completely destroyed in this period.  However, Moldavia and Maramureş, located in modern-day northern Romania,  were never part of the Roman province of Dacia and would remain free from Roman rule.

Siege
The only historical record of the siege is Trajan's Column, which is a controversial source. There is debate as to whether the Romans did actually fight for Sarmizegetuza, or whether the Dacians destroyed their capital while fleeing ahead of the advancing legions. Most historians agree that a siege of Sarmizegetuza actually took place.

The first assault was repelled by the Dacian defenders. The Romans bombarded the city with their siege weapons and, at the same time, built a platform to more easily breach the fortress. They also encircled the city with a circumvallatio wall. 

Finally, the Romans destroyed the water pipes of Sarmizegetuza and obliged the defenders to surrender before they set fire to the city. Roman forces succeeded in entering the Dacian sacred enclosure, hailed Trajan as emperor, and then leveled the whole fortress. IV Flavia Felix was stationed there to guard the ruins of Sarmizegetuza. Following the conclusion of the siege, Bicilis, a confidant of Decebalus, betrayed his king, and led the Romans to the Dacian treasure, which, according to Jerome Carcopino (p. 73), consisted of 165,000 kilograms of pure gold and 331,000 kilograms of silver in the bed of the Sergetia River (Cassius Dio 68.14).

Aftermath
Decebalus and many of his followers escaped the legions during the siege. They fled east, probably towards the fortification of Ranisstorum (the location of which is now lost), only to be caught by the Roman cavalry. Knowing the often brutal treatment of prisoners of war given by the Romans, Decebalus killed himself to avoid capture.

Decebalus' head and right arm were later presented to Trajan.  The Romans reorganized Dacia as a Roman province and built another capital-city at a distance of 40 kilometers from the old Sarmizegetuza. This center was named Colonia Ulpia Traiana Dacica Augusta Sarmizegetuza. The Roman Senate celebrated the founding by ordering the minting of a sestertius dedicated to the optimus princeps.  

Losses sustained in this war by the Dacians were tremendous, but the Roman army also took significant casualties in the conquest of Dacia. The first Dacian rebellion against Roman rule would coincide with the death of Trajan, in 117, showing the effect the Emperor had on the Dacians after the war.  Even in modern Romanian folklore, Trajan is remembered as Traian, and his great wars with the "people of the mountains" are still remembered in Romanian epic songs.

Whilst the battle ended in Roman victory, it is considered by historians as the last great conquest of the Roman Empire before its eventual decline.

See also
 Dacian warfare
 List of Roman battles

References
 Mihai Manea, Adrian Pascu, and Bogdan Teodorescu, Istoria romanilor (Bucharest, 1997), pages 107-122.
 Cassius Dio, Roman History, books 67-68.
 Jerome Carcopino, Points de vue sur l'ìmpérialisme romain (Paris, 1924).

Tapae
106
Sarmizegetusa
Sarmizegetusa
Ancient history of Transylvania